Basgal (also, Azizbekovo, Baskal, and Baskhal) is a settlement and municipality in the Ismailli Rayon of Azerbaijan.  It has a population of 400.

Gallery

References 

Populated places in Ismayilli District